Vít Pavlišta is a Czech long-distance runner that earned a qualifying time for the marathon at the 2016 Olympics.

Pavlišta has won national championships in mountain running, the half marathon, and the marathon.  This includes the 2015 marathon title. He also has other national podium finishes.

He has a background in nordic combined.

He is considered an amateur runner.

References

Living people
Czech male long-distance runners
Czech male marathon runners
Year of birth missing (living people)
Czech Athletics Championships winners